Changgang County is a kun, or county, in north-central Chagang province, North Korea.  Originally part of Kanggye, it was made a separate county in 1949.  It borders Hwapyong and Rangrim to the east, Kanggye and Sijung to the west, Songgan to the south, and Chasong to the north.

The terrain of Changgang is rugged and mountainous, with the Kangnam Mountains in the northeast and the Chogyuryong Mountains in the southwest. The highest peak is Kumpasan (금파산, 1918 m) along the northern border.

History

Early history
No artefacts from the paleolithic or neolithic periods have been found, but human existence during these periods is suspected based on discoveries from the neighboring Chasong County. Human existence during the Bronze Age is attested from the pottery from the Mumun pottery period. Black pottery, stone axes Bronze daggers, and crescent stone knives found in Gongwidong and Pungryongdong (the dongs that existed when it was still part of greater Kanggye county. Modern day. Kanggye City and Sijung County). In the early iron age, knife money from the Ancient Chinese state of Yan was found in Nonamdong (Dong which was 
part of Kanggye county, modern day Ronam-ri, Sijung County.)

Kanggye county

Changjin county

Birth of Changgang County to current day
Changgang county was born from the merger of Changjin county and Kanggye county in 1949.In 1952, Dong mun myeon of Changgang county became part of the newly created Rangrim County, Gokhamyeon and Oroimyeon became part of the newly created Sijung County, and part of Gongbuk myeon became part was divided between the administration of Kanggye city and Songgan County.

Administrative divisions 
Changgang county is divided into 1 ŭp (town), 3 rodongjagu (workers' districts) and 10 ri (villages):

Economy 
There are soft-drink, clothing and pharmaceutical factories in the county. Rice is grown along the Chongsong River (종성강); various other agricultural produce are grown in the large areas of land which Kim Il-sung suggested be cleared in a 1974 letter. 75% of the county is for agricultural purposes, most of which are fields. Animals are raised in the county, utilising mountains and fields for grazing. Logging takes place in the county, with production and processing of the wood taking place in the county.

The largest industry in the county is hydroelectricity generation, followed by mining. Zinc, graphite, fluorite and lead is mined. The county has a number of small to medium sized hydropower stations, fed by larger hydropower stations such as the Kanggye Youth Power Plant.

Transport 
Changgang is served by road and rail, with the Kanggye Line passing through the southeast.

Roads from Kanggye and Hyesan, Kanggye and Rangrim, Changgang and Manpo, Kanggye and Taehung, Changgang and Wonpyong run through the county.

See also
Geography of North Korea
Administrative divisions of North Korea
Chagang

References

External links
Satellite view

Counties of Chagang